Hilary Bart-Smith is a Scottish mechanical engineer known for her work on biologically inspired structures including robot fish. She is professor of mechanical and aerospace engineering at the University of Virginia, where she is the founder of both the Multifunctional Materials and Structures Laboratory and the Bio-inspired Engineering Research Laboratory.

Education and career
Bart-Smith studied mechanical engineering at the University of Glasgow, earning first-class honors there in 1995. She came to the US for graduate study at Harvard University, where she completed a Ph.D. in engineering sciences in 2000, supervised by Anthony G. Evans and John W. Hutchinson.

After postdoctoral research at Princeton University, she joined the department of mechanical and aerospace engineering at the University of Virginia in 2002.

Research
Bart-Smith's doctoral dissertation, Metallic Foams: Performance and Use in Ultralight Sandwich Structures, concerned the structural properties of metal foams and metal sandwich panels. Her subsequent research has included the development of underwater robot fish whose swimming motions mimic manta rays and tuna. Her research has also included the use of tensile structures to provide portable emergency shelter.

References

External links
Home page

Year of birth missing (living people)
Living people
American mechanical engineers
American women engineers
Scottish mechanical engineers
Scottish women engineers
Alumni of the University of Glasgow
Harvard School of Engineering and Applied Sciences alumni
University of Virginia faculty
American women academics
21st-century American women